Yeta III was a king of Barotseland, of the Lozi people in what is now Western Zambia.

Family 
The parents of Yeta were King Lewanika and Queen Ma-Litia.

Yeta married a woman called Kumayo who became his consort at Sefula Church in 1892. They were baptized together.

Later Yeta married another woman.

His children were:
Son
Prince Daniel Akafuna Yeta — named after king Akafuna Tatila
Prince Edward Kaluwe Yeta — father of Prince Godwin Mando Kaluwe Yeta
Prince Richard Nganga Yeta
Princess Mareta Mulima
Princess Elizabeth Inonge Yeta  III
Princess
Princess Nakatindi
King Ilute

Reign 
Yeta was enthroned at Lealui on March 13, 1916, and abolished the traditional system of corvee, the last vestige of slavery on 1 April 1925.

Yeta attended the coronation of King George VI and Queen Elizabeth at Westminster Abbey in London, but experienced a severe stroke which caused partial paralysis and loss of speech in early 1939. Yeta's secretary wrote: "The Coronation was the greatest event we ever saw or will ever see in our lives again. Nobody could think that he is really on earth when seeing the Coronation Procession, but that he is either dreaming or is in Paradise."

He abdicated in favour of his younger brother Imwiko.

See also
Litunga
Nyame, divine ancestor of Lozi kings

References

Litungas
20th-century rulers in Africa
Royalty and nobility with disabilities